Sugar is an upcoming television series developed by Mark Protosevich and starring Colin Farrell who also serves as executive producer. Fernando Meirelles is set to direct. It is set to air on Apple TV+.

Premise 
The plot is still under wraps. The only thing it's known is that it will be a "a genre-bending contemporary take on the private detective story set in Los Angeles".

Cast

Main
 Colin Farrell
 Kirby Howell-Baptiste
 Amy Ryan
 Dennis Boutsikaris
 Alex Hernandez
 Lindsay Pulsipher

Recurring
 Anna Gunn
 James Cromwell
 Nate Corddry as David Siegel
 Sydney Chandler
 Miguel Sandoval
 Elizabeth Anweis
 Jason Butler Harner
 Massi Furlan as Carlos
 Adrian Martinez

Production 
It was announced in December 2021 that Apple TV+ had won a bidding war for the rights to the series, which had Colin Farrell attached to star. Farrell would officially join the series in June 2022, when it was given the greenlight from Apple TV+. In August 2022, Kirby Howell-Baptiste, Amy Ryan, Dennis Boutsikaris, Alex Hernandez and Lindsay Pulsipher joined the main cast, with Anna Gunn and James Cromwell cast to recur. In September, Nate Corddry, Sydney Chandler, Miguel Sandoval, Elizabeth Anweis and Jason Butler Harner were added to the cast.

Production for the series began in August 2022, which is expected to wrap in the fall.

References

External links
 

Apple TV+ original programming
Upcoming television series